Tom Reynolds is the pseudonym of Brian Kellett, a nurse and once emergency medical technician for the London Ambulance Service, England, whose award-winning blog, Random Acts of Reality, has been published in two books, Blood, Sweat & Tea in 2006 and More Blood, More Sweat & Another Cup of Tea in 2009. His career in the NHS started at the age of 23 when he worked as an Accident and Emergency nurse. Since beginning his blog he has been interviewed in newspapers, television and radio, and now provides opinion pieces on medical care in some UK newspapers.

His first book was used as the basis for the Channel 4 series Sirens, which first aired in June 2011.

Bibliography
 Blood, Sweat & Tea, The Friday Project, 2006
 More Blood, More Sweat and Another Cup of Tea, The Friday Project, 2009

See also
 Healthcare in London

References 

English bloggers
English diarists
Nurses from London
Writers from London
1971 births
Living people
British male bloggers